José Santiago may refer to:

José Santiago (1950s pitcher) (1928–2018), Puerto Rican pitcher in Major League Baseball, 1954–1956
José Santiago (1960s pitcher) (born 1940), Puerto Rican pitcher in Major League Baseball, 1963–1970
José Santiago (2000s pitcher) (born 1974), Puerto Rican pitcher in Major League Baseball, 1997–2005
José Avilés Santiago, Puerto Rican politician; mayor of Moca 2001–2021
Jose L. Santiago, American politician
José Luis Santiago Vasconcelos (1957–2008), Mexican civil servant killed in an aviation accident
José Turiano Santiago (1875–1942?), Filipino patriot in the 1896 Philippine Revolution

See also
Josian Santiago (born 1957), Puerto Rican mayor of Comerío